Jakkapan Prommaros is a Thai football player who currently plays for Thailand Premier League side Sisaket.

References

1983 births
Living people
Jakkapan Prommaros
Association football midfielders
Jakkapan Prommaros